Shane Clayton (born 24 October 1978) is a former Australian rules footballer who played for Fitzroy, the Brisbane Lions and the Kangaroos in the Australian Football League (AFL), including their victorious 1999 Grand Final.

Originally from the Northern Knights, Clayton debuted in the AFL for Fitzroy with whom he appeared 13 times. Following Fitzroy's merger, he played five games with the Brisbane Lions over two seasons before moving to the Kangaroos.

Statistics

|-
|- style="background-color: #EAEAEA"
! scope="row" style="text-align:center" | 1996
|style="text-align:center;"|
| 40 || 13 || 1 || 1 || 87 || 53 || 140 || 34 || 9 || 0.1 || 0.1 || 6.7 || 4.1 || 10.8 || 2.6 || 0.7
|-
! scope="row" style="text-align:center" | 1997
|style="text-align:center;"|
| 40 || 3 || 0 || 0 || 8 || 4 || 12 || 3 || 1 || 0.0 || 0.0 || 2.7 || 1.3 || 4.0 || 1.0 || 0.3
|- style="background-color: #EAEAEA"
! scope="row" style="text-align:center" | 1998
|style="text-align:center;"|
| 40 || 2 || 0 || 0 || 9 || 4 || 13 || 4 || 4 || 0.0 || 0.0 || 4.5 || 2.0 || 6.5 || 2.0 || 2.0
|-
! scope="row" style="text-align:center;" | 1999
|style="text-align:center;"|
| 23 || 25 || 10 || 12 || 177 || 75 || 252 || 74 || 33 || 0.4 || 0.5 || 7.1 || 3.0 || 10.1 || 3.0 || 1.3
|- style="background-color: #EAEAEA"
! scope="row" style="text-align:center" | 2000
|style="text-align:center;"|
| 23 || 24 || 8 || 11 || 264 || 120 || 384 || 108 || 34 || 0.3 || 0.5 || 11.0 || 5.0 || 16.0 || 4.5 || 1.4
|-
! scope="row" style="text-align:center" | 2001
|style="text-align:center;"|
| 23 || 20 || 15 || 8 || 163 || 82 || 245 || 70 || 23 || 0.8 || 0.4 || 8.2 || 4.1 || 12.3 || 3.5 || 1.2
|- style="background-color: #EAEAEA"
! scope="row" style="text-align:center" | 2002
|style="text-align:center;"|
| 23 || 16 || 17 || 12 || 153 || 58 || 211 || 66 || 16 || 1.1 || 0.8 || 9.6 || 3.6 || 13.2 || 4.1 || 1.0
|-
! scope="row" style="text-align:center" | 2003
|style="text-align:center;"|
| 23 || 13 || 1 || 2 || 105 || 65 || 170 || 56 || 8 || 0.1 || 0.2 || 8.1 || 5.0 || 13.1 || 4.3 || 0.6
|- style="background-color: #EAEAEA"
! scope="row" style="text-align:center" | 2004
|style="text-align:center;"|
| 23 || 1 || 0 || 0 || 1 || 0 || 1 || 1 || 0 || 0.0 || 0.0 || 1.0 || 0.0 || 1.0 || 1.0 || 0.0
|- class="sortbottom"
! colspan=3| Career
! 117
! 52
! 46
! 967
! 461
! 1428
! 416
! 128
! 0.4
! 0.4
! 8.3
! 3.9
! 12.2
! 3.6
! 1.1
|}

References

External links

1978 births
Living people
North Melbourne Football Club players
North Melbourne Football Club Premiership players
Brisbane Lions players
Fitzroy Football Club players
Northern Knights players
Australian rules footballers from Victoria (Australia)
One-time VFL/AFL Premiership players